Princess Kasune Zulu (born 6 January 1976) is a Zambian politician and member of the National Assembly of Zambia since 2016. She is a prominent AIDS activist, the first National Assembly member to announce she was living with the condition.

Biography
Princess Kasune was born 12 November 1975 in Kabwe, the daughter of a Zambian railway police force commander. She was raised and educated as a Roman Catholic.

In the late 1980s, at the start of the Zambian AIDS epidemic, her mother died as a result of the syndrome, quickly followed by her father. Princess Kasune married when she was 17; her older husband, Moffat Zulu, it transpired, had already lost two of his previous wives to AIDS. In 1997 she took an AIDS test which proved positive, prompting her to begin a life of AIDS activism.

Initially she took an unconventional approach by giving the appearance of a prostitute and hitching lifts with long-distance lorry-drivers, who she would then lecture on the importance of condom use. She was appointed an ambassador for World Vision International's Hope Programme, and in that capacity travelled to the US in 1993 to meet President George H. W. Bush; his greeting her with a kiss on both cheeks resulted in headlines in Zambia and around Africa. She was also selected as a delegate on a 2005 "Women and AIDS U.S. Tour: Empower Women, Save Lives," tour sponsored by the United Nations. She is a host of Positive Living, ahealth-related  radio program.

In 2016, she was elected as a member of the National Assembly of Zambia for the constituency of Keembe, as a member of the United Party for National Development. As one of her earliest acts in the Assembly, she announced she had been living with HIV since 1997 - the first assembly member to declare their HIV status.

Princess Kasune's biography on the National Assembly of Zambia's website states that she has a master's degree in divinity, and a Masters in Non-Profit Administration.

References

1975 births
Living people
HIV/AIDS activists
Members of the National Assembly of Zambia
United Party for National Development politicians
21st-century Zambian women politicians
21st-century Zambian politicians
People from Kabwe District
Zambian activists
People with HIV/AIDS
Zambian women activists